Alfred Pinsonneault (ca. 1830 – August 20, 1897) was a Quebec farmer and political figure. He represented Laprairie in the House of Commons of Canada as a Conservative member from 1867 to 1887.

He was born in Saint-Jacques-le-Mineur, Quebec around 1830. He served as a lieutenant-colonel in the local militia and was also justice of the peace. He was elected to the Legislative Assembly of the Province of Canada in a by-election in 1863 after the sitting member was appointed a judge; he was reelected in the general election later that same year and again after Confederation. He retired from politics in 1887. In 1888, he was named harbour master for the port of Saint-Jean-sur-Richelieu.

External links

1897 deaths
Members of the Legislative Assembly of the Province of Canada from Canada East
Conservative Party of Canada (1867–1942) MPs
Members of the House of Commons of Canada from Quebec
Year of birth uncertain
People from Montérégie
1830 births
Canadian justices of the peace